Sebastian Antero Aho (born 26 July 1997) is a Finnish professional ice hockey player and alternate captain for the Carolina Hurricanes of the National Hockey League (NHL). Aho formerly played with Oulun Kärpät in the Finnish Liiga. Aho made his professional debut with Oulun Kärpät during the 2013–14 season. Drafted 35th overall in the 2015 NHL Entry Draft, he made his NHL debut during the 2016–17 season with the Hurricanes.

Playing career

Liiga
Aho made his Liiga debut playing with Oulun Kärpät during the 2013–14 season.

Carolina Hurricanes
Aho was rated amongst the top 20 European forward skaters eligible for the 2015 NHL Entry Draft. In the draft, he was selected in the second round, 35th overall, by the Carolina Hurricanes.

On 13 June 2016, Aho signed a three-year, entry-level contract with Carolina. On 13 October 2016, he made his NHL debut—and recorded his first point, an assist—in the opening game of the 2016–17 season. On 12 November 2016, he scored his first goal, which was followed by a second goal in a 5–1 win over the Washington Capitals. On 31 January 2017, Aho scored his first career hat-trick in a game against the Philadelphia Flyers. Consequently, he became the youngest player in Hurricanes/Whalers franchise history to score a hat-trick.

After the Hurricanes failed to make the 2018 Stanley Cup playoffs, Aho represented Finland at the 2018 IIHF World Championship.

During the 2018–19 season, Aho passed Ron Francis' franchise record for longest season-opening point streak by recording a point in the Hurricanes' first 12 games, as well as tied an NHL record for recording a point per game from the start of the season. His streak ended on 3 November in a 4–3 overtime loss to the Arizona Coyotes. On 2 January, Aho was selected to participate in the 2019 NHL All-Star Game after leading the team in goals, assists and points through 38 games. On 13 January 2019, Aho recorded his second career hat-trick in a 6–3 win over the Nashville Predators. Aho led the Hurricanes in scoring (five goals, seven assists) during their first trip to the playoffs in 10 years in the 2018–19 season.

On 1 July 2019, Aho signed an offer sheet with the Montreal Canadiens, becoming the first player to sign an offer sheet since Ryan O'Reilly in 2013. The contract included a lucrative bonus structure, including $21.7 million within the first 12 months of the contract. On 7 July, the Hurricanes officially matched the offer sheet, re-signing Aho to a five-year, $42.27 million contract.

Personal life 
Aho was born in the Satakunnan keskussairaala in Pori, but his legal birthplace is Rauma.

Career statistics

Regular season and playoffs

International

Awards and honors

References

External links
 

1997 births
Living people
Ässät players
Carolina Hurricanes draft picks
Carolina Hurricanes players
Finnish expatriate ice hockey players in the United States
Finnish ice hockey centres
Oulun Kärpät players
People from Rauma, Finland
Sportspeople from Satakunta